Pareiorhaphis eurycephalus is a species of catfish in the family Loricariidae. It is native to South America, where it occurs in the Canoas River basin in the state of Santa Catarina in Brazil, with its type locality being listed as near Urubici. The species reaches 6.3 cm (2.5 inches) in standard length and is believed to be a facultative air-breather.

References 

Loricariidae